Mohammed Asad Ullah Sayeed (6 October 1918 – 18 March 1997) was an IAS officer with government of Andhra Pradesh from 1950 to 1978 and former founding chairman of NAM (National Association Of Muslims) which is a charitable organisation based out of Hyderabad,India.He served as district collector of Mahbubnagar, Khammam and East Godawari districts of the then undivided state of Andhra Pradesh.

Early life
Mohammed Asad Ullah Sayeed was born in Hyderabad, Telangana (former undivided Andhra Pradesh). His father Mohammad Habib Ullah Sayeed and Ayesha Begum Sayeed were from a prominent family of Navayets from Hyderabad of whom were several officers under the Nizam's government of Hyderabad state like Hasnuddin Ahmed, father of Allahuddin Ahmed, who was the City Police Commissioner of Hyderabad and later Director of Police Commissioner of Nizam state of Hyderabad. Another was Aziz Yar Jung who was an officer under the government of the Nizams of Hyderabad state

Other work
Asad Ullah Sayeed was the founding Chairman of Hyderabad-based NAM foundation which is a charitable organization for upliftment of muslims.

References

 

20th-century Indian Muslims
Politicians from Hyderabad, India
1918 births
1997 deaths